Grave Halloween (also known as The Suicide Forest and released in some markets as Deathly Halloween) is a 2013 Canadian TV horror film. An original production by CineTel Films for Syfy, it was directed by Steven R. Monroe and written by Ryan W. Smith and Sheldon Wilson. The film is set in Japan, but it was filmed in Canada.

Plot

On October 31, a Japanese-born American student at a Japanese university, Maiko (Kaitlyn Leeb), risks her life to save the spirit of her dead mother. She travels into Aokigahara Forest to find her birth mother, who has recently committed suicide. Her friends Kyle, Terry, and Amber travel with her, in hopes of producing a documentary for a class project.

Cast
 Kaitlyn Leeb as Maiko
Isabelle Beech as Young Maiko
 Cassi Thomson as Amber
 Graham Wardle as Kyle
 Dejan Loyola as Terry
 Jeffrey Ballard as Craig
 Hiro Kanagawa as Jin
 Jesse Wheeler as Brody
 Tom Stevens as Skylar
 Kevan Ohtsji as Policeman
 Hyuma Frankowski as Junior Policeman
 Maiko Miyauchi as Maiko's Mother
 Luna Kurokawa as Maiko's Sister
 Yukari Komatsu as Bracelet Woman

Reception

Dave Wain, writing for British horror magazine Scream, gave Grave Halloween 1.5 stars out of five, calling the film "a real let-down". Guy Adams, reviewing the film for the British Fantasy Society, said the film was "nothing special but, in an increasingly dense forest of grotty cinematic deadwood, there is enough life in it to be worth your time".

See also
 The Forest
 Forest of the Living Dead

References

External links

Grave Halloween on Rotten Tomatoes

2013 television films
2013 films
2013 horror films
2010s supernatural horror films
Canadian supernatural horror films
Canadian horror television films
CineTel Films films
English-language Canadian films
Halloween horror films
Films directed by Steven R. Monroe
Films set in Aokigahara
Films set in forests
Films set in Japan
Films shot in Vancouver
Syfy original films
Japan in non-Japanese culture
2010s American films
2010s Canadian films